The  is a social order seen in the construction of stylized Kofuns that appeared in the early Kofun period of Japan. It is believed to represent a new level of social complexity and the advent of the Yamato Kingship

Overview
The concept was proposed in 1991 by Archaeologist Hiroshi Tsuide. In addition, Kazuo Hirose and Yoshiro Kondo have proposed similar concepts under the name of anterior-posterior tomb state and anterior-posterior tomb order, respectively, but the emphasis of the arguments differs among the theorists, and there are conflicting opinions, especially from the perspective of state formation theory.

Hiroshi Tsuide has argued that the construction of the Hashihaka Kofun in Sakurai City, and other stylized anterior-posterior round tombs marked the beginning of the Kofun period, by which time there was already a state-level society.  He argued that the centralized political order as seen in the formulation of the funerary system should be called the anterior-posterior mound system.

Kazuo Hirose has argued that the forward and backward circle mounds developed in various parts of the Japanese archipelago and are characterized by three points: visibility as a "showing kingship," uniformity in shape, and hierarchy manifested in the scale of the mounds. The Yamato Kingship was the center of a social network, or what should be called the "anterior-posterior mound nation. According to Hirose, the "anterior-posterior mound nation" is defined as "a community of interest of the chiefdoms operated by the Yamato regime with commonality in terms of territory, military rights, diplomatic rights, and ideology. It also states that there is a hierarchy between the anterior and posterior tombs, and that the anterior and posterior tombs are the tombs of politically inferior secondary members.

Yoshiro Kondo explains the historical significance of the formation of the anterior-posterior mound as follows: "The advanced tribal chiefs of various regions of Japan, centering on the Kinai central region and Kibi, gathered together for internal and external needs, broke away from their narrow Ancestral Spirit world, that is, the regional Ritual. In addition to the above, there are many other factors that may have contributed to the development of the Japanese archipelago.

The concept of the "anterior-posterior mound system" proposed by Tsuruide was a significant proposal in the study of ancient history and Archaeology, and has influenced almost all researchers in the field. The name "anterior-posterior tomb system," named by the proponent, has also been widely followed.

Sadayuki Watanabe states that in the late Yayoi period, Yayoi burial mounds were established in a unique form in each region, and ritual and political forces were formed in each region, while in the Kofun period, the size of the anterior and posterior circle mounds increased, and the protruding parts were arranged in the anterior part.

In addition, Hironobu Ishino states that the anterior-posterior mound was adopted as the tomb of Okimi in the middle of the 3rd century and continued until the end of the 6th century, but the fact is that the Tsukushi Kunizukuri, who was a general of the rebellion in the Emperor Keitai In fact, the Keitai dynasty, the rebellious general Chikushi Kunizo Iwai also built tombs in the front and back, so the "front and back tomb system" was just a spirit of the chiefs, and the content of rituals actually changed greatly.

Kenji Fujita disagrees with the assumption that a unified system was established "throughout the entire region" from the beginning of the 350 years of construction of giant anterior-posterior mounds. I think it is a good indicator that by the middle of the Kofun period, a power structure was in place with large anterior-anterior-cylindrical tombs being built in various parts of the country, and that the relationship between the central Kinki chiefs and local chiefs would have been at best an alliance. This is one indicator.

On the other hand, it has been pointed out that the existence of the "anterior-posterior mound system" cannot be confirmed based on nationwide statistical data on the shape and size of the emperor's mausoleum, the number and distribution of its bases, the historical transition of its construction, and the location of the ancestral and oldest types.

See also 
 Dolmen
 Grave mound
 Tumulus

Notes

References 

Kofun period
Archaeology of Japan